Sky Landscape is a sculpture by Louise Nevelson.

It was commissioned by the American Medical Association, dedicated on March 10, 1988, and is located at 1101 Vermont Avenue, N.W. Washington, D.C.

See also
 List of public art in Washington, D.C., Ward 2
 Sky Landscape I (1983), Olympic Sculpture Park, Seattle

References

External links
Sky Landscape

Outdoor sculptures in Washington, D.C.
1988 sculptures
Aluminum sculptures in Washington, D.C.
1988 establishments in Washington, D.C.